Any Way the Wind Blows is the second and final studio album by American country music duo Brother Phelps. After its release, Doug re-joined country rock band The Kentucky Headhunters, of which he and Ricky Lee were both members previous to Brother Phelps' inception. This album produced singles in its title track and "Not So Different After All", although neither charted in the Top 40 on the Billboard country charts. The title track was originally recorded by J. J. Cale on his 1974 album Okie. The track "Ragtop" was previously recorded by The Kentucky Headhunters on their 1989 debut album Pickin' on Nashville, while "Cinderella" is a cover of a song originally released by the rock band Firefall. "Down into Muddy Water" would later be recorded by Shelly Fairchild on her 2004 debut album Ride.

Track listing
"Any Way the Wind Blows" (J. J. Cale) - 3:09
"Down into Muddy Water" (Dennis Linde) - 3:46
"Mary Ann Is a Pistol" (Linde) - 3:10
"Not So Different After All" (Jeff Hughes, Irene Kelly) - 3:24
"Walls" (Mary Ann Kennedy, Pam Rose) - 3:08
 "Cinderella" - 3:04 (Larry Burnett)
"I Ain't Ever Satisfied" (Steve Earle) - 3:51
"Ragtop" (Ricky Lee Phelps, Doug Phelps) - 3:14
"The Other Kind" (Earle) - 4:30
"Johnny" (R. L. Phelps, D. Phelps) - 3:30
"Lookout Mountain" (Linde) - 4:27

Personnel
Al Anderson - electric guitar
Mike Brignardello - bass guitar
Larry Byrom - electric guitar
Dan Dugmore - steel guitar
Paul Leim - drums, percussion, washboard
Doug Phelps - vocals
Ricky Lee Phelps - vocals
Richard Ripani - organ, piano
Hank Singer - fiddle
Billy Joe Walker, Jr. - electric guitar

Chart performance

References

1995 albums
Asylum Records albums
Brother Phelps albums
Albums produced by Kyle Lehning